Harry Graham may refer to:

Harry Graham (cricketer) (1870–1911), Australian cricketer and footballer
Harry Graham (poet) (1874–1936), English journalist, poet and lyricist for musicals and operettas
Harry Graham (Manitoba politician) (1921–2006), Canadian politician
Harry Graham (footballer) (1887–1940), Scottish footballer
Harry Graham (priest) (1909–1979), English Anglican priest
Harry Graham (MP) (1850–1933), British Member of Parliament for St Pancras West, 1892–1906

See also
Henry Graham (disambiguation)